The Rolladen-Schneider LS4 is a Standard Class single seat glider manufactured by Rolladen-Schneider Flugzeugbau GmbH between 1980 and 2003.

Development
The LS4, successor to the LS1 in the Standard Class, made its first flight in 1980. It is the fifth most produced non-military glider (after the Grunau Baby, Blaník, Schleicher K 8 trainers and Grob G102 Astir.) A total of 1,048 were built until Rolladen-Schneider entered receivership in 2003. Its long production run is comparable only to that of the Grob G102 Astir and the Schempp-Hirth Discus.

The LS4 won the first two places in the Standard Class at the 1981 World Championships in Paderborn, West Germany, and the first six places (and twenty-one out of the first twenty-five) at the 1983 World Championships in Hobbs, New Mexico. It is still a favourite in handicapped competitions and as a club and recreational aircraft.

This type consolidated Rolladen-Schneider's reputation for well-rounded sailplanes that are both easy to fly and top performers. It is docile enough for beginners and its performance is only slightly below the latest standard-class sailplanes. Given the continued interest in the type, the LS4 may be put back in production by the Slovenian manufacturer AMS-Flight.

The LS4 was succeeded by the LS7.

Design
The design of the LS4 was influenced mainly by the experience Rolladen-Schneider had gained with the LS2 and LS3 flapped gliders. Wolf Lemke returned to a double-tapered wing planform, giving it a larger area comparatively to the LS1 and LS2, and enlarged all control surfaces: the ailerons were elongated and brought further inboard and the tailplane span was increased.

The fuselage and vertical stabilizer were taken from the LS3 moulds. Other notable features of the design were the retractable landing gear, the centre of gravity tow release that retracts with landing gear, the heel-operated wheel brakes, the upper wing surface air brakes and the water ballast system with internal bags.

Structure
The structure is entirely glass-reinforced plastic mostly with synthetic foam cores. The exterior coating, as with most composite gliders, is gelcoat, which protects the load-bearing composite from humidity and UV-radiation, and is thick enough to allow wing profiling, which is done by hand during the finishing stages of manufacturing to achieve the smoothness required for extensive laminar flow.

Variants
LS4 The initial production version
LS4-afeatured larger water ballast bags allowing for an additional  of water to be carried in each wing. The landing gear system is strengthened by the addition of one extra set of shock absorption bumpers in order to handle the increased gross weight with a full water ballast load.

The wing shells are made in carbon, control connections are automatic, the instrument panel tilts up with the canopy and it has an optional tail fin water ballast system.

Specifications (LS4)

See also

References

Further reading

External links

LS-Flugzeugbau website
Johnson R, A Flight Test Evaluation of an LS4-a, Soaring, September 1984
Sailplane Directory

1980s German sailplanes
Rolladen-Schneider aircraft
Aircraft first flown in 1980
Mid-wing aircraft
T-tail aircraft